The 2020 China League One was the 17th season of the China League One, the second tier of the Chinese football league pyramid, since its establishment in 2004. The season was scheduled to begin on 29 February and end on 1 November, but was postponed following the COVID-19 pandemic in China. On 26 August 2020, Chinese Football Association announced that the season would be resumed on 12 September 2020 and 18 teams would be split into three groups in three locations, Group A in Chengdu, hosted by Chengdu Better City, Group B in Meizhou, hosted by Meizhou Hakka, and Group C in Changzhou, hosted by Kunshan F.C.

In this season, the number of teams are expanded from 16 to 18.

Changchun Yatai won the league for the second time, their first since 2003.

Teams

Team changes

To League One
Teams relegated from 2019 Chinese Super League
 Beijing Renhe

Teams promoted from 2019 China League Two
 Shenyang Urban
 Chengdu Better City
 Taizhou Yuanda
 Suzhou Dongwu
 Jiangxi Liansheng
 Sichuan Jiuniu
 Kunshan F.C.

From League One
Teams promoted to 2020 Chinese Super League
 Qingdao Huanghai
 Shijiazhuang Ever Bright

Dissolved entries
 Guangdong South China Tiger
 Sichuan Longfor
 Liaoning F.C.
 Shanghai Shenxin

Name changes
 Shenyang Urban F.C. changed their name to Liaoning Shenyang Urban F.C. in April 2020.
 Zhejiang Greentown F.C. changed their name to Zhejiang Energy Greentown F.C. in September 2020.

Clubs

Stadiums and locations

Clubs locations

Managerial changes

Foreign players

The policy of foreign players was changed. The number of foreign players clubs can register over the course of the season is limited to four and the number of foreign players allowed on each team at any given time is increased from three to four. A maximum of three foreign players can be registered for each match with a maximum of two can be fielded at any time during the match. In addition, each club can register a Hong Kong, Macau, or Taiwan player of Chinese descent (excluding goalkeepers), provided that he registered as a professional footballer in one of those three association for the first time, as a native player.
Players name in bold indicates the player is registered during the mid-season transfer window.

 For Hong Kong, Macau, or Taiwanese players, if they are non-naturalized and were registered as professional footballers in Hong Kong's, Macau's, or Chinese Taipei's football association for the first time, they are recognized as native players. Otherwise they are recognized as foreign players.

Regular season

Group A

Stadiums
Chengdu Longquanyi Football Stadium
Chengdu Wenjiang Football Base
Shuangliu Sports Centre
Dujiangyan Phoenix Stadium (Reserve)

League table

Results

Positions by round

Results by match played

Group B

Stadiums
Hengbei Football Town Field 9
Wuhua County Olympic Sports Centre
Wuhua County Stadium

League table

Results

Positions by round

Results by match played

Group C

Stadiums
Changzhou Institute of Technology Football Field
Changzhou Olympic Sports Centre
Jiangyin Stadium

League table

Results

Positions by round

Results by match played

Promotion stage

League table

Results

Positions by round

Results by match played

Relegation stage

Group E

League table

Results

Positions by round

Results by match played

Group F

League table

Results

Positions by round

Results by match played

Relegation play-offs

Overview

First leg

Second leg

4–4 on aggregate. Heilongjiang Lava Spring won 5–3 on penalties.

Jiangxi Liansheng won 3–2 on aggregate.

Statistics

Top scorers

Hat-tricks

League attendance

Notes

References

External links

China League One seasons
2
China